Lucky Ali Malik (born 20 October 2003) is a Danish cricketer. He made his Twenty20 International (T20I) debut for Denmark, against Finland, on 13 July 2019.

In August 2019, he was named in Denmark's squad for the 2019 Malaysia Cricket World Cup Challenge League A tournament. He made his List A debut for Somalia, against Qatar, in the Cricket World Cup Challenge League A tournament on 23 September 2019.

In 2018, he participated in a tournament in the Netherlands (European cup) where the Netherlands, Essex cricket county, Sweden participated. During the tournament there was a trophy at stake (Man of the tournament European cup) and in this tournament Lucky Ali Malik took 14 wickets and made 123 points with the bat, where he took 7 wickets for only 3 points. In October 2021, he was named in Denmark's T20I squad for the Regional Final of the 2021 ICC Men's T20 World Cup Europe Qualifier tournament.

References

External links
 

2003 births
Living people
Danish cricketers
Denmark Twenty20 International cricketers
Sportspeople from Copenhagen